The discography of Warpaint, an American indie rock band, consists of four studio albums, three EPs, eleven singles, and seven music videos.

Warpaint was formed in Los Angeles, California in 2004 by Emily Kokal (vocals, guitar), Theresa Wayman (guitar, vocals), Jenny Lee Lindberg (bass, backing vocals) and Shannyn Sossamon (drums, backing vocals). The band self-released its debut EP, Exquisite Corpse, in August 2008. The release, which was mixed by Red Hot Chili Peppers guitarist John Frusciante and featured Josh Klinghoffer, failed to chart but was well received by critics when reissued on Manimal Vinyl in October 2009.

Following a number of lineup changes, including the recruitment of current drummer Stella Mozgawa, Warpaint released its debut studio album, The Fool, in October 2010 on Rough Trade Records. The album received favorable critical acclaim, charted in mainstream and independent charts in the United States, the United Kingdom and Ireland, and was followed by over 12 months of extensive touring; it had sold approximately 60,000 copies in the UK and 150,000 copies worldwide as of January 2014. The band's eponymous second studio album, Warpaint, was released in January 2014 to largely positive reviews and placed in several international charts.

Albums

Studio albums

Extended plays

Singles

Retail singles

Notes

Promotional singles

Split singles

Music videos

Miscellaneous appearances

Other appearances

Notes

References

External links

Discographies of American artists
Rock music group discographies
Discography